Weronika Krystyna Budny (born 30 October 1941, maiden name Stempak) is a Polish cross-country skier. She competed at the 1964, 1968 and the 1972 Winter Olympics.

Cross-country skiing results

Olympic Games

World Championships

References

External links
 

1941 births
Living people
Polish female cross-country skiers
Olympic cross-country skiers of Poland
Cross-country skiers at the 1964 Winter Olympics
Cross-country skiers at the 1968 Winter Olympics
Cross-country skiers at the 1972 Winter Olympics
People from Jarosław County